is the fifth single by Japanese girl group NMB48.

Track listing

Members

"Virginity" 
 Team N: Mayu Ogasawara, Kanako Kadowaki, Rika Kishino, Haruna Kinoshita, Riho Kotani, Kei Jōnishi, Miru Shiroma, Aina Fukumoto, Nana Yamada, Sayaka Yamamoto, Akari Yoshida, Miyuki Watanabe
 Team M: Eriko Jō, Airi Tanigawa
 Kenkyūsei 3rd Generation: Yūka Katō, Shū Yabushita

"Mōsō Girlfriend" 
 Team N: Mayu Ogasawara, Kanako Kadowaki, Rika Kishino, Haruna Kinoshita, Riho Kotani, Kei Jōnishi, Miru Shiroma, Aina Fukumoto, Nana Yamada, Sayaka Yamamoto, Akari Yoshida, Miyuki Watanabe
 Team M: Eriko Jō, Airi Tanigawa
 Kenkyūsei 3rd Generation: Yūka Katō, Shū Yabushita

"Bokura no Regatta" 
Shirogumi
 Team N: Rina Kondō, Kei Jōnishi, Nana Yamada, Sayaka Yamamoto
 Team M: Rena Shimada, Eriko Jō, Mao Mita, Sae Murase
 Kenkyūsei 2nd Generation: Yuki Azuma, Hitomi Yamamoto
 Kenkyūsei 3rd Generation: Rina Kushiro, Kanako Muro

"Sonzai Shiteinai Mono" 
Akagumi
 Team N: Mayu Ogasawara, Kanna Shinohara, Aina Fukumoto, Yūki Yamaguchi, Akari Yoshida, Miyuki Watanabe 
 Team M: Ayaka Okita, Yui Takano, Natsumi Yamagishi
 Kenkyūsei 2nd Generation: Momoka Hayashi
 Kenkyūsei 3rd Generation: Hono Akazawa, Tsubasa Yamauchi

"Sunahama de Pistol" 
Namba Teppōtai Sono Ichi
 Team N: Riho Kotani, Shiori Matsuda 
 Team M: Ayame Hikawa, Ayaka Murakami, Fūko Yagura, Keira Yogi
 Kenkyūsei 3rd Generation: Yūka Katō, Shū Yabushita

"Chotto Nekoze" 
 Team M: Riona Ōta, Rena Kawakami, Runa Fujita 
 Kenkyūsei 1st Generation: Arisa Koyanagi
 Kenkyūsei 2nd Generation: Yūmi Ishida, Mizuki Uno, Narumi Koga, Sorai Satō, Hiromi Nakagawa, Rurina Nishizawa, Momoka Hayashi
 Kenkyūsei 3rd Generation: Anri Ishizuka, Anna Ijiri, Mirei Ueda, Mako Umehara, Yūri Ōta, Emika Kamieda, Konomi Kusaka, Rina Kushiro, Hazuki Kurokawa, Saki Kōno, Rikako Kobayashi, Kano Sugimoto, Riko Takayama, Sora Tōgō, Riko Hisada, Arisa Miura, Kanako Muro, Tsubasa Yamauchi

Oricon Charts

References

2012 singles
Japanese-language songs
Songs with lyrics by Yasushi Akimoto
Oricon Weekly number-one singles
Billboard Japan Hot 100 number-one singles
NMB48 songs
2012 songs